Aliona Bolsova won the title, defeating Nina Potočnik in the final, 7–5, 6–1

Mia Ristić was the defending champion, but lost to Potočnik in the semifinals.

Seeds

Draw

Finals

Top half

Bottom half

References

External Links
Main Draw

Vrnjačka Banja Open - Singles